Lobsticks are traditional markers found in the Boreal Forests of Canada created by removing the middle (or  lower)  branches of a coniferous (pine) tree.

Usage

The lobstick was created by cutting off most of the lower branches of tall pine or spruce trees. The remaining tuft on the top would make the tree conspicuous from a distance. Occasionally other trees surrounding the lobstick would be cut down to further improve its visibility.  In some instances, the bark was removed and names were carved on the wood. The usages could be both practical and symbolic. Lobsticks would mark trails or portages, sources of food, or hunting grounds. They were also used as cultural markers, to signify meeting places, burial grounds, ceremonial sites, personal totems or to honour someone. Lobsticks could also be known as "lopsticks" or maypoles. Explorer Warburton Pike wrote in the 1800s: "In giving directions to a stranger it is hopeless to describe the points and bends of a monotonous river highway, but a lop-stick does the duty of a signpost and at once settles the question of locality."

History

First Nations communities used lobsticks since pre-history to mark trails and hunting grounds. The practice was later adopted by the first Europeans who travelled through northern Canada. Explorer Alexander Mackenzie found lobsticks on his travels and wrote that they "denoted the immediate abode of the natives". In 1790, voyageur Peter Pangman created a lobstick at Rocky Mountain House to mark the furthest extent of discovery along the Saskatchewan River. In the 1820s fur trader Alexander Ross found a lobstick marking the mouth of the Berens River.

Place names

Many places across Canada are named after the lobsticks that once stood there. They include:

Lobstick (town), Alberta	
Lobstick Bay, Ontario
Lobstick Bay, Manitoba
Lobstick Creek, Manitoba
Lobstick Creek, Alberta
Lobstick Creek, Northwest Territories
Lobstick Island, Ontario
Lobstick Island, Saskatchewan
Lobstick Island, Alberta	
Lobstick Island, British Columbia
Lobstick Island, Northwest Territories
Lobstick Lake, Newfoundland and Labrador
Lobstick Lake, Saskatchewan	Lake
Lobstick Narrows, Manitoba
Lobstick Point, Saskatchewan
Lobstick River, Alberta	
Lobstick Settlement, Alberta
Maypole Island, Reindeer Lake

References

Forests of Canada